Jack Caruthers Vowell Sr. (July 24, 1899 – September 16, 1969) was an American football player and coach of football and basketball.  He played college football at the University of Texas at Austin. Vowell served as the head football coach the College of Mines and Metallurgy of the University of Texas—now known as the University of Texas at El Paso (UTEP)—from 1922 to 1923, compiling a record of 8–8. He was also the head basketball coach at Texas Mines in 1923–24, tallying a mark of 3–10.

Head coaching record

References

External links
 

1899 births
1969 deaths
Texas Longhorns football players
UTEP Miners football coaches
UTEP Miners men's basketball coaches